Andrew Arbuckle (September 5, 1887 – September 21, 1938) was an American stage and film actor. He was the brother of Macklyn Arbuckle and cousin of Roscoe "Fatty" Arbuckle.

Early life
Arbuckle was born in Galveston, Texas, to a family of Scottish descent. His brother Macklyn was 20 years old at the time of Andrew's birth.

Career
Arbuckle first made his film debut in Little Mary Sunshine (1916), playing Bob's father. In 1935, he made his last appearance in film The Dark Angel in an uncredited role as Mr. Gallop. He appeared in a total 44 films, uncredited in ten of them.

He is known for his appearances in Peggy Leads the Way, The Family Skeleton and Little Mary Sunshine.

Personal life
Arbuckle married Blanche Duquesne, daughter of French immigrants, in October 1915. They had no children.

Death

Andrew Arbuckle died on September 21, 1938, in Los Angeles, aged 51, of a suspected heart attack, as had his cousin, Roscoe in 1933. Andrew Arbuckle was buried in an unmarked grave, plot #470, at Hollywood Memorial Park Cemetery Garden of Ancestors.

Filmography

 Graft (1915)
 The Red Circle (1915)
 The Heart Breakers (1916)
 Little Mary Sunshine (1916) – Bob's Father
 The Girl That Didn't Matter (1916)
 The Matrimonial Martyr (1916) – Prof. Stanley
 A Lucky Leap (1916)
 A Soul at Stake (1916)
 A Plumber's Waterloo (1916)
 Big Tremaine (1916) – Samuel Leavitt
 Should She Obey? (1917) – Uncle John
 Happiness (1917) – Nicodemus
 Peggy Leads the Way (1917) – H.E. Manners
 Naughty, Naughty! (1918) – Adam Miller
 The Family Skeleton (1918) – Dr. Griggs
 Confession (1918) – The governor
 His Own Home Town (1918) – Rev. John Duncan
 Denny from Ireland (1918) – Priest
 A Romance of Happy Valley (1919) – Clergyman
 The Love Hunger (1919) – Bob Clinton
 Common Clay (1919) – Mr. Neal
 A White Man's Chance (1919) – Valentino
 The Hoodlum (1919) – Pat O'Shaughnessy
 John Petticoats (1919) – Rameses
 Pinto (1920) – Guardian
 Darling Mine (1920)
 Unseen Forces (1920) – Mr. Leslie
 The Son of Wallingford (1921) – Talbot Curtis
 Mother o' Mine (1921) – Henry Godfrey
 Say Uncle (1921)
 The Light in the Clearing (1921) – Horace Dunkelberg
 The Deuce of Spades (1922) – Fat Ed
 Caught Bluffing (1922) – Ham Thomas
 Saved by Radio (1922) – Pat
 Quincy Adams Sawyer (1922)
 The Spider and the Rose (1923) – The Priest
 Name the Man (1924) – Vondy
 The Dangerous Coward (1924) – David McGuinn
 The Clean Heart (1924) – Bickers
 The Fighting Boob (1926) – Old Man Hawksby
 Hazardous Valley (1927)
 Jazz Mad (1928) – Schmidt
 Ex-Rooster (1932)
 The Dark Angel (Uncredited, 1935) – Mr. Gallop

External links

American male film actors
American male silent film actors
Male actors from Texas
American people of Scottish descent
People from Galveston, Texas
Male actors from Los Angeles
Burials at Hollywood Forever Cemetery
1887 births
1938 deaths
20th-century American male actors